Barratta is a rural town and a locality in the Shire of Burdekin, Queensland, Australia.

Geography
Barratta Creek rises in the locality and runs north through Jerona to the Coral Sea, while Barramundi Creek also rises and runs to the north-west.

The Bruce Highway runs through from east to west.

History 
Barratta was originally known as Noondoo, but the name was changed to Baratta by notification in the Queensland Government Gazette on 25 September 1897. The spelling of name was corrected to Barratta in another Queensland Government Gazette notice on 21 March 1902. Barratta is believed to be an Aboriginal name for the chain of lagoons in the area.

References

External links 
 Town map of Barratta, 1979

Towns in Queensland
Shire of Burdekin
Localities in Queensland